The 1985 Luquan earthquake occurred on April 18, 1985, at 13:52 local time (05:52 UTC). The epicenter was near Luquan County, Yunnan, China. Research showed that the source of this earthquake was Zeyi Fault (则邑断层). Twenty-two people were killed and more than 300 injured in this earthquake.

See also
List of earthquakes in Yunnan
List of earthquakes in China

References

External links

Earthquakes in Yunnan
Luquan Earthquake, 1985
Luquan Earthquake, 1985
April 1985 events in Asia
Geography of Kunming